Hatchet Lake Water Aerodrome  is located on Hatchet Lake, Saskatchewan, Canada.

See also 
List of airports in Saskatchewan
Hatchet Lake Airport

References 

Registered aerodromes in Saskatchewan
Seaplane bases in Saskatchewan